Francesco Massimiliano Volpe (born 3 March 1986) is an Italian footballer who plays as a forward for Piacenza.

Football career
Volpe joined Juventus along with Domenico Criscito in 2004 in co-ownership deal, for €1.9M (both priced €1.9M in full ownership, but sold back 50% to for €0.95M and €0.95M, and paid via the transfer of Antonio Nocerino in co-ownership deal, priced €450,000). Volpe signed a 5-year contract.

They went through the Juventus youth system. Volpe was bought permanently in June 2005 for another €250,000, as Genoa cut €700,000. In 2006, he joined Ravenna Calcio, on loan from Juventus with option to sign 50% rights for €450,000, which Ravenna did in June. In July 2007 he joined A.S. Livorno Calcio of Serie A in another co-ownership deal. Livorno paid Juve €1M and Juve paid the same amount to Ravenna to acquire him. But he just played twice at Serie A and followed the team relegated to Serie B. In 2008–09 season, he made 23 league appearances (mainly as sub) and won promotion back to Serie A as playoffs winner.

In July 2009 he was loaned to Triestina, where he made 15 starts in 22 league appearances. In June 2011 Juventus gave up the remain 50% registration rights to Livorno, made a write-down of €617,000.

On 31 August he was sold to Piacenza in another co-ownership deal. for €500,  along with Fabrizio Di Bella on loan. They were part of the deals that Antonio Piccolo joined Livorno. During the season Piacenza bankrupted and a new entity "Lupa Piacenza" restarted in amateur level. In September 2012 Volpe signed a 1-year deal with Lupa Piacenza. The club promoted to 2013–14 Serie D and renamed to Piacenza Calcio 1919. Volpe also renewed his contract with the club.

Honours 
Juventus Primavera
Torneo di Viareggio (1): 2005 
Campionato Primavera (1): 2005–06

Ravenna
Serie C1 (1): 2006–07

Lupa Piacenza
Eccellenza Emilia–Romagna (1): 2012–13

References

External links

aic.football.it

Italian footballers
Genoa C.F.C. players
Juventus F.C. players
Ravenna F.C. players
U.S. Livorno 1915 players
Piacenza Calcio 1919 players
Serie A players
Serie B players
Italy youth international footballers
Association football forwards
Footballers from Naples
1986 births
Living people